Charles Edward Thomas Griffith (28 August 1857 - 25 June 1934) was Dean of Llandaff from 1913 until 1926.

Griffith was educated at Trinity College, Cambridge, and ordained in 1882. After a curacy in Merthyr Tydfil, he was Vicar of Blaenavon, then Trevethin. He was Rector of Machen from 1901 until his appointment as Dean.

Alumni of Trinity College, Cambridge
Deans of Llandaff
1857 births
1934 deaths